Self-hatred is  personal self-loathing or hatred of oneself, or low self-esteem which may lead to self-harm.

In psychology and psychiatry
The term "self-hatred" is used infrequently by psychologists and psychiatrists, who would usually describe people who hate themselves as "people with low self-esteem". Self-hatred, self-guilt and shame are important factors in some or many mental disorders, especially disorders that involve a perceived defect of oneself (e.g. body dysmorphic disorder). Self-hatred is also a symptom of many personality disorders, including borderline personality disorder, as well as mood disorders like depression. It can also be linked to guilt for someone's own actions that they view as wrongful, e.g., survivor guilt.

In social groups
Self-hatred by members of ethnic groups, gender groups, and religions is postulated to be a result of internalization of hatred of those groups from dominant cultures.

African-Americans 

Racial stereotyping of African-Americans and negative American media portrayals of Black men and women have spread outside of the U.S., influencing people of all races worldwide, and increasing self-hatred.

Catholics
Self-hating or "anti-Catholic Catholics" are terms of critique by traditionalist or conservative Catholics to describe modernist or liberal Catholics, especially those who seek to reform doctrine, make secularist critiques of the Catholic Church, or place secular principles above Church teachings.

Jews 

Theodor Lessing, in his book, Jewish Self-Hatred (1930), identified this as a pathology, “a manifestation of an over identification with the dominant culture and internalization of its prejudices.” There have been studies from sources stated in the scholarly research, “mental illness in Jews often derived from feelings of inferiority and self-hatred resulting from persecution and their subordinate position in society.”

The term has been used to label American Jews accused of hiding their identity “by converting or intermarrying and raising their children in another faith” to overcome sociopolitical barriers due to antisemitism in the United States.

LGBT+ individuals 

Internalized homophobia refers to negative stereotypes, beliefs, stigma, and prejudice about homosexuality and LGBT people that a person with same-sex attraction turns inward on themselves, whether or not they identify as LGBT.

Related concepts

Self-deprecation 

Self-deprecation is the act of belittling, undervaluing, or disparaging oneself, or being excessively modest. It can be used in humor and tension release.

Self-harm 

Self-harm is a condition where subjects may feel compelled to physically injure themselves as an outlet for depression, anxiety, or anger, and is related with numerous psychological disorders.

In some cases, self-harm can lead to accidental death or suicide. It is not a definitive indicator, however, of a desire either to commit suicide or even of its consideration.

See also

Anti-Germans (political current)

Internalized oppression
Sadomasochism
White guilt

References

Further reading 
 Sander L. Gilman Difference and Pathology: Stereotypes of Sexuality, Race and Madness Cornell University Press, 1985.

External links
Western Eyes video documentary by Ann Shin

Ego psychology
Hatred
Borderline personality disorder